A statue of a Quarter Pounder stands outside a McDonald's restaurant in Rapid City, South Dakota, United States. The statue was erected in 2020.

History 
In February 2020, in honor of the 50th anniversary of the Quarter Pounder being introduced at McDonald's, the fast food chain created the Quarter Pounder Fan Club and began selling merchandise based on the burger, including Quarter Pounder-scented candles, t-shirts, and stickers. Additionally, the company announced that one city in the United States would be home to a bronze statue of the burger. Ultimately, Rapid City, South Dakota was chosen as the site for this monument, beating other contending cities in Hawaii, North Dakota, and Wyoming. According to a McDonald's representative, the city was chosen because it had "the most Quarter Pounder with Cheese fans per capita". Additionally, Rapid City is known for its several monuments. City council member Darla Drew unveiled the statue on February 26, 2020 (Ash Wednesday) outside the McDonald's located along Cheyenne Boulevard, near Interstate 90. This particular McDonald's was chosen due to its large parking lot and closeness to the Interstate. As part of the dedication ceremony, 500 Quarter Pounders were given away for free at the location.

The statue was designed by Utah-based sculptor Raymond Gibby, while the pedestal was created by Bott Monument of Riverton, Wyoming. The monument took over 1,800 hours to create.

Design 
The bronze statue rests on a granite pedestal which bears the phrase "hot and deliciously juicy" in Latin. Each of the sesame seeds on the statue's top bun are approximately 20 times the size of a regular seed. The combined statue and pedestal weigh .

See also 
 2020 in art
Novelty architecture

References 

2020 establishments in South Dakota
2020 sculptures
Bronze sculptures in the United States
Buildings and structures in Rapid City, South Dakota
Food and drink sculptures
McDonald's buildings and structures
Novelty architecture
Outdoor sculptures in South Dakota
Tourist attractions in Rapid City, South Dakota